Aller is a village in the civil parish of Kentisbeare in the historic county of Devon, England.

Historically, it has been known by other names, such as Aulers during the 15th century. Alre, Alra, Avra, and Avvra have all been used since the 10th century.

References

External links 
 

Villages in Devon
Mid Devon District